Medina, originally Young's Corner, is an unincorporated community in the Town of Dale in southwest Outagamie County, Wisconsin, United States.

Postal service is provided by the Hortonville post office, ZIP code 54944.

History
The first settlers in Medina were Zebediah Hyde, Lewis Hyde, and Alva McCrary, and Samuel Young and sons, who arrived in 1848.

The town was originally named Young's Corner after one of Samuel Young's sons, William Young. The name was changed to Medina prior to 1851.

A post office called Medina was established in 1852, and remained in operation until it was discontinued in 1966. The community was named after Medina, Ohio.

Geography
Medina is located at  (44.2727609, -88.6378863), and the elevation is 820 feet (250 m).

Education
Educational services are provided by the School District of New London

Transportation
Medina is located on Wisconsin Highway 96. Outagamie County Highways M also intersects the community.

Notable people
Henry N. Culbertson, farmer and Wisconsin legislator, was born in Medina.
William H. H. Wroe, merchant and Wisconsin legislator, lived and was Treasurer and Postmaster of Medina.

Images

References

External links
School District of New London
Post Crescent-West Newspaper
USGS GNIS in Google Map

Unincorporated communities in Outagamie County, Wisconsin
Unincorporated communities in Wisconsin